Vespasiano Strada (1582–1622) was an Italian painter and engraver of the early-Baroque period, mainly active in Rome. His biography is summarized by Giovanni Baglione.

He was born of Spanish parentage in Rome. He worked chiefly in fresco, and had embellished the churches and public edifices at Rome with several of his historical paintings. He painted for the cloister of the monastery of Sant' Onofrio, and for the church of Santa Maria Maddalena in Campo Marzio, the Visitation of the Virgin Mary to St. Elisabeth, and the Adoration of the Shepherds. He died at Rome, at the age of thirty-six years, in the pontificate of Pope Paul V.

Sources

1582 births
1622 deaths
16th-century Italian painters
Italian male painters
17th-century Italian painters
Italian Baroque painters
Italian Mannerist painters